Larry Dean Arp Jr. (born July 7, 1966) is a  Republican member of the North Carolina House of Representatives. He has represented the 69th district (including constituents in Northwestern Union County) since 2013.

Life and career
Arp earned a degree in civil engineering from The Citadel and a master of science in civil engineering from the University of North Carolina at Charlotte. He is a licensed professional engineer and structural engineer and the president of Arp Engineering in Monroe, North Carolina. He represents Union County, North Carolina, in the General Assembly.

Committee assignments

2021-2022 session
Appropriations (Senior Chair)
Appropriations - Capital (Vice Chair)
Energy and Public Utilities (Chair)
Homeland Security, Military, and Veterans Affairs
Judiciary III
Transportation

2019-2020 session
Appropriations (Chair)
Appropriations - Capital Committee (Vice Chair)
Appropriations - General Government (Vice Chair)
Energy and Public Utilities (Chair)
Homeland Security, Military, and Veterans Affairs
Judiciary
Transportation

2017-2018 session
Appropriations (Chair)
Energy and Public Utilities (Chair)
Homeland Security, Military, and Veterans Affairs
Judiciary I
Transportation
Insurance

2015-2016 session
Appropriations (Vice Chair)
Appropriations - Capital (Chair)
Public Utilities (Chair)
Homeland Security, Military, and Veterans Affairs
Judiciary I
Transportation
Education - Community Colleges
Insurance

2013-2014 session
Appropriations
Public Utilities
Judiciary
Transportation
Education

Electoral history

2020

2018

2016

2014

2012

References

Living people
1966 births
People from Charlotte, North Carolina
People from Union County, North Carolina
The Citadel, The Military College of South Carolina alumni
University of North Carolina at Charlotte alumni
Republican Party members of the North Carolina House of Representatives
21st-century American politicians